Marcel Rozier (born 22 March 1936) is an equestrian from France and Olympic champion. He also owns the renowned Espace Rozier equestrian center in Bois-le-Roi, Seine-et-Marne. He collaborated with the perfume company Chez Marionnaud to establish the Team Marionnaud, a show jumping team that includes his own sons, Philippe and Thierry Rozier. Charlotte Casiraghi of Monaco's Princely Family also rode for this team from 2001 to 2004
.

Medals 
1968 : Silver Medal, Mexico Olympics
1970 : Gold Medal, French Championshipss
1971 : Gold Medal, French Championships
1974 : Gold Medal, French Championships
1976 : Gold Medal, Montréal Olympics

References

External links 
Espace Rozier (official)

1936 births
Living people
French male equestrians
French show jumping riders
Olympic equestrians of France
Olympic gold medalists for France
Olympic silver medalists for France
Equestrians at the 1968 Summer Olympics
Equestrians at the 1972 Summer Olympics
Equestrians at the 1976 Summer Olympics
Olympic medalists in equestrian
Medalists at the 1976 Summer Olympics
Medalists at the 1968 Summer Olympics